Houssenaly Zahid Raza was an Honorary Malaysian Consul in Madagascar, who was murdered on 24 August 2017.

Biography 
Raza had been tasked with returning pieces of debris from Malaysia Airlines Flight 370, which vanished on March 8, 2014 en route from Kuala Lumpur to Beijing, with 239 crew and passengers on board. A wreck hunter, Blaine Gibson, has claimed that the murder took place in an effort to hinder the investigation into the plane's disappearance. Gibson also claims he has been subject to death threats, which he says are related to his investigative efforts.

A representative of the Independent Group, which has been following the disappearance of MH370, said the timing of Houssenaly’s death was “suspicious” as he had been scheduled to visit the Malagasy transport ministry to retrieve the debris and return it to Malaysia. The representative noted that Houssenaly was of French Malagasy nationality, and added that the diplomat's death had been met with “stony silence” from both French and Malaysian authorities. The diplomat's car was riddled with bullets, and a French news agency has speculated that he had been killed as revenge for his alleged involvement in the 2009 abduction of several residents of Indo-Pakistani descent. Other sources have denied this, and note that he was not convicted of any crime related to that incident.

Malaysia’s foreign ministry said Houssenaly was first appointed Malaysia’s Honorary Consul in Madagascar in December 2013 for a three-year term – and this was recently extended to December 2019.

See also
List of unsolved murders

References

20th-century births
2017 deaths
Malagasy businesspeople
Male murder victims
People murdered in Madagascar
Search for Malaysia Airlines Flight 370
Unsolved murders in Africa
2017 crimes in Madagascar
2017 murders in Africa